The Royal New Zealand Nursing Corps (RNZNC) is a corps of the New Zealand Army. The corps was initially formed in 1915 from civilian nurses who volunteered for service during World War I, and who were granted honorary officer ranks. A Nursing Reserve had been formed as part of the New Zealand Medical Corps on 14 May 1908. Today, the corps is an officer-only corps that consists of commissioned officers who are employed for their specialist skills and knowledge as registered nurses, the corps works in conjunction with the Royal New Zealand Army Medical Corps and the Royal New Zealand Dental Corps to promote "health and disease prevention" and to provide "care for the wounded and sick". Nursing Officers in the New Zealand Army can be employed broadly in primary health, perioperative, surgical or emergency settings, which can see RNZNC personnel providing health services in a garrison health centre, in a civilian practice, or deployed on operations.

Up until 1945, the corps was a part-time only formation with personnel being called up for full time service during times of war only. However, since then the RNZNC has developed into a corps of both Regular and Reserve personnel. Throughout the corps' history, personnel have been deployed to various operational theatres. Aside from service during World War I and World War II, the corps has deployed personnel support to operations during the Vietnam War, and more recently to peacekeeping operations such as those in Bosnia and Somalia in the 1990s, the 1991 Gulf War, the East Timor intervention, Bougainville, Iraq and Afghanistan.

New Zealand Nurses: Boer War

New Zealand Nurses: Samoan Expeditionary Forces 1914
Bertha Grace Nurse 
Fanny Wislon
Vida Mary Katie MacLean
Louise Alexa McNie
Evelyn Gertrude Brooke
Louise Elizabeth Brandon
Ida Grace Willis

Matrons-in-Chief 1915–1957
MiC Hester Maclean RRC 7 August 1910 – 9 November 1923
MiC Jessie Bicknell ARRC 10 November 1923 – 31 March 1931
MiC Fanny Wilson RRC 7 May 1931 – 4 July 1933
MiC Ida Grace Willis OBE, ARRC, ED 5 July 1933 – 22 February 1946
MiC Eva C, Mackay OBE, RRC, ED 23 February 1946 – 14 August 1954
MiC Doris I. Brown (Milne) RRC, ED 15 August 1954 – 31 December 1957

Principals Matrons 1958–1977
PM Christina McDonald RRC 1 April 1958 – 21 August 1964
PM Mary W. Wilson RRC 22 August 1964 – 29 April 1970
PM Lois Jones ARRC 29 April 1970 – 17 May 1977

Lieutenant Colonels 1977–1991
Lt Col Helen J. Macann RRC 18 May 1977 – 14 July 1983
Lt Col Noeline J. Taylor ARRC 14 July 1983 – 1 March 1985
Lt Col THursa M. Kennedy RRC 1 March 1985 – 3 June 1991

Chief Nursing Officer 1991–Current
Lt Col Daphne M. Shaw RRC 1 July 1991 – 1 January 1997
Lt Col Diane S. Swap MNZM 2 January 1997 – 23 June 2002
Lt Col Gerar P. Wood CStJ 24 June 2002 – 12 December 2007
Lt Col Maree K. Sheard 13 December 2007 – 10 December 2012
Lt Col Lee M. Turner 10 December 2012–
Lt Col Michelle Williams

Order of precedence

References

Further reading
 
 

Administrative corps of New Zealand
New Z
Military nursing
Military units and formations established in 1915
Organisations based in New Zealand with royal patronage